The 2021 Classic Brugge–De Panne (known as Oxyclean Classic Brugge–De Panne for sponsorship reasons) was a road cycling one-day race that took place on 24 March 2021 in Belgium. It was the 45th edition of the Three Days of Bruges–De Panne, and the 8th event of the 2021 UCI World Tour.

Teams
Twenty-five teams were invited to the race, including seventeen UCI WorldTeams and eight UCI ProTeams. , with five riders, were the only team to not compete with the maximum allowed of seven riders. Of the 173 riders who were entered into the race, there were 158 finishers and three non-starters.

UCI WorldTeams

 
 
 
 
 
 
 
 
 
 
 
 
 
 
 
 
 

UCI ProTeams

Result

References

Classic Brugge–De Panne
Classic Brugge–De Panne
Classic Brugge–De Panne
Three Days of Bruges–De Panne